The 2019–20 Tahiti Ligue 1 is the 73rd season of the Tahiti Ligue 1, the top-flight football league in Tahiti. The season started on 27 September 2019. Vénus are the defending champions.

Teams
A total of ten teams compete in the league. Arue and Taiarapu were relegated from the previous season, and were replaced by promoted teams Taravao AC and Olympique de Mahina.
Central Sport
Dragon
Jeunes Tahitiens
Manu-Ura
Olympique de Mahina
Pirae
Taravao AC
Tefana
Tiare Tahiti
Vénus

League table
On 16 May 2020, the Tahitian Football Federation announced that the 2019–20 Tahiti Ligue 1 season had been concluded due to the COVID-19 pandemic in French Polynesia, and the remaining three rounds were cancelled. Originally, it was decided that the title would not be awarded. The top three teams of the league table (at the time of suspension on 17 March 2020) would play in a triangular play-off, with the following rules:
The team which finished 1st in the league table would start with 3 points.
The team which finished 2nd in the league table would start with 2 points.
The team which finished 3rd in the league table would start with 1 point.
The top two teams of the play-off would qualify for the 2021 OFC Champions League. No teams would be relegated and the league would consist of 12 teams next season.

However, on 27 May 2020 following new consultation with the clubs, Pirae, who were leading the table, were declared champions, and qualified for the 2021 OFC Champions League together with Vénus, who were at second place. Tiare Tahiti, who were at third place, qualified for the 2020–21 Coupe de France seventh round as the representative of Tahiti (which would originally be awarded to the winners of the 2019–20 Tahiti Cup, which had also been abandoned). The decision on promotion and relegation remained the same.

Top scorers

Hat-tricks

See also
2019–20 Tahiti Cup

References

External links
Fédération Tahitienne de Football
Ligue 1, FTF
Sports Tahiti

Tahiti Ligue 1 seasons
Tahiti
Tahiti
1
Tahiti